The EMD F125 "Spirit" is a four-axle passenger diesel locomotive manufactured by Electro-Motive Diesel (EMD) for the North American market since 2015. The locomotive is capable of traveling at a maximum in-service speed of  pulling consists of up to 10 cars. It was EMD's first new passenger locomotive for the North American market in 15 years, with the most recent predecessor passenger locomotive being the EMD DE30AC and DM30AC built for the Long Island Rail Road.

Features of the F125 include Tier 4 emissions compliance (with exhaust after-treatment), AC traction systems, extended-range blend and dynamic brakes with HEP regeneration capabilities, advanced crash energy management (CEM) technology, and a streamlined body design, designed by Vossloh of Spain.

History
The Los Angeles commuter rail agency Metrolink was the launch customer for the EMD F125, with an order for 40. The cost of the base order of 10 units with an option of additional 10 was estimated at $150 million, with delivery commencing in 2016. The base order was signed on May 31, 2013 for 10 locomotives with an option for additional 10, which has since been exercised. Additional orders were exercised as funding became available. They replaced the EMD F59PH and F59PHI.

The first locomotive began testing in the first quarter of 2016 and was shown to the public on July 18, 2016 at Los Angeles Union Station during a special event, and had its first mainline run on June 10, 2017. 

The bulk of the order was expected to be delivered by April 2017, but major problems with the locomotives had prevented their full acceptance by Metrolink. In November 2018, Metrolink announced that only five locomotives had been accepted, and the project was two years behind schedule. As of 2022, all F125 locomotives had been delivered to Metrolink and placed in service. 

The F125 competes with other Tier 4 compliant locomotives, such as the Siemens Charger series and the MPI MPXpress MP54AC. Both the F125 and MP54AC have struggled to find customers, unlike the Charger series, which has sold more than 350 units including large orders from Amtrak and Via Rail.

References

External links
 F125 Product Page – Progress Rail

Electro-Motive Diesel locomotives
Caterpillar locomotives
Passenger locomotives
Diesel-electric locomotives of the United States
Bo-Bo locomotives
Railway locomotives introduced in 2013
EPA Tier 4-compliant locomotives of the United States
Standard gauge locomotives of the United States